Shobi Thilakan is an Indian actor and voice-over artist who works prominently in Malayalam films and television. Son of late actor Thilakan Shobi has won the Kerala State Film Award as the best dubbing artist in 2021.

Early life and career 
Shobi is the son of famed actor Thilakan and one of the industry's most well-known dubbing artists. 

He provides the on-screen voice for a number of actors in films and television shows.
He is currently seen in the show 'ManjilVirinjaPoovu', in which he plays a hefty part. Shobi was recently seen in a cameo in 'Ammayariyathe.' The award for best dubbing artist went to Shobi Thilakan. He received the prize for his performance in the film Bhoomiyile Manohara Swargayajyam.

Filmography

Voice-over

Television

References 

Indian male film actors
Year of birth missing (living people)
Living people
Male actors from Kerala
Kerala State Film Award winners
Indian male television actors
Indian male voice actors